Greenfield International School (GIS; formerly Greenfield Community School) is an international, private school, located in Dubai Investments Park, Dubai, UAE.

The school was established in 2007 and has followed the IB Curriculum since 2011. GIS is managed by the Taaleem group, with education for children from Pre-K to Grade 12.

Curriculum
GIS is  Baccalaureate World Continuum School. It is one of only a few schools in the world authorized to offer all four IB Programmes like the Primary Years Programme (PYP), Middle Years Programme (MYP), Diploma Programme (DP), and as one of the first schools in the UAE to offer the IB Career-related Programme (IBCP) with BTEC courses.

The school student body comes from over 80 countries and with over 50 different languages. The school offers a GIS English as an Additional Language (EAL) programme to assist students. Students at GIS are also encouraged to continue to study their native languages, as part of the school's Mother Tongue program.

Accreditation and inspections
GIS is accredited by the New England Association of Schools and Colleges (NEASC) and the Council of International Schools (CIS).

The Knowledge and Human Development Authority (KHDA) of Dubai has rated Greenfield International School as "Good" with some aspects being "Very Good" or "Outstanding".

References

External links

 Greenfield International School official website
 

2007 establishments in the United Arab Emirates
Educational institutions established in 2007
International schools in Dubai
International Baccalaureate schools in the United Arab Emirates
Private schools in the United Arab Emirates